Jonas Karlsson may refer to:

Jonas Karlsson (born 1971), Swedish actor and author
Jonas Karlsson (journalist) (born 1977), Swedish sports journalist with Sveriges Television
Jonas Karlsson (ice hockey) (born 1986), Swedish ice hockey player
Jonas W. Karlsson, Finnish music producer